The Arco dei Gavi is an ancient structure in Verona, northern Italy. It was built by the gens Gavia, a noble Roman family who had their hometown in Verona, at the beginning of the Via Postumia, the Roman road leading to the city. During the Middle Ages it was used as a gate in the walls.

History
The arch was commissioned to architect L. Vitruvius Cerdo in the 1st century AD, likely during the reign of Tiberius. The arch was erected by a prominent local family, the Gavi. It putatively stood at the beginning of the Via Sacra or via Postumia  of the ancient Roman city of Verona. A stone contained an inscription stating: Lucius Vitruvius Libertus or Cerdon Lucius Vitruvius architect. Later scholars often mistook this for someone with an link to the famed architect Vitruvius. The flanking niches appear to have held statues of family members.

In the Middle Ages, during the communal age of Verona, the city's council used it as an entrance gate when it was decided to surround Verona with a line of walls.

During the period of Napoleonic rule in Italy French engineers demolished it. Its ruins were moved to a square and then to the Arena. Using some of the original stones, a proposed reconstruction of the arch was completed in 1932. This reconstruction was based on a wooden model made prior to demolition, and proposed reconstructions drawn up as early as the 16th century by Andrea Palladio. These models underscore the reverence held for even trivial examples of monumental Roman architecture. The Arch was reconstructed under Mussolini, exhorting Italy to identify with its Roman past. The arch was rebuilt next to Castelvecchio, not far from its original location.

See also
List of Roman triumphal arches

References

Sources

Gavi
Gavi
Roman sites of Veneto
Buildings and structures completed in 1932
Tourist attractions in Verona